The Universidad del Valle de Guatemala (UVG) (University of the Valley of Guatemala) is a private, not-for-profit, secular university in Guatemala City, Guatemala. It was founded in 1966 by a private foundation, which had previously overseen the American School of Guatemala. It was the first private university to give a strong emphasis to technology and technical background in the country. UVG holds the registry for the .gt country-code domain name.

Faculties
The university has seven faculties:
 Engineering
 Education
 Social Studies
 Science and Humanities
 Design Innovation and Arts
 Global Management and Business Intelligence
 Colegio Universitario

Associations and clubs
UVG has clubs and associations, which promote student participation.

Each career may have its own association. Currently, the university has 15 associations:

 Asociación de Estudiantes de Biología
 Asociación de Estudiantes de Ciencias Sociales y Ecoturismo
 Asociación de Estudiantes de Ingeniería Civil
 Asociación de Estudiantes de Ingeniería en Alimentos
 Asociación de Estudiantes de Ingeniería Ciencias de la Computación
 Asociación de Estudiantes de Ingeniería Industrial
 Asociación de Estudiantes de Ingeniería Mecánica
 Asociación de Estudiantes de Química Farmacéutica
 Asociación de Estudiantes de Nutrición
 Asociación de Estudiantes de Psicología
 Asociación de Estudiantes de Educación
 Asociación de Estudiantes de Bioquímica y Microbiología
 Asociación de Estudiantes de Ingeniería Electrónica
 Asociación de Estudiantes de Ingeniería Mecatrónica
 Asociación de Estudiantes de Ingeniería Química
 Asociación de Estudiantes de Facultad de Ingeniería 
 Asociación de Estudiantes de Facultad de Ciencias Humanas
 Asociación de Estudiantes de Facultad de Ciencias Sociales

The school has clubs for interested students.

 Art Club
 Music Club
 Theater Club
 Volleyball Club
 Chess Club
 Lecture Club
 and others

See also
 List of universities in Guatemala

External links 
 Official website of the Universidad del Valle de Guatemala
 Official website of the Universidad del Valle Foundation

Universidad del Valle de Guatemala
Educational institutions established in 1966
1966 establishments in Guatemala